Hukitola Bay and Hukitola Island are located in Odisha, India, north of the Mahanadi river delta. The island was formed from silt deposits. There is a building on the island, which was constructed by British colonists circa 1867 to serve as a rice storehouse. The building has a total plinth area of more than 7,000 square feet, which carries proof of British architectural skill with rainwater harvesting systems.

In late 2013, the building began to be renovated by the State Archaeological Department, with the goal of making it into an eco-tourist spot.

How to Visit:

First you need to reach to Bhubaneshwar, capital of Odisha. From Bhubaneshwar, you can get a bus direct to Jambu(frequency is very less) or you can hire a cab. Jambu is around 121km from Bhubaneshwar. Once you reached Jambu, you need to hire a boat which will float through a mangroves forest and then you will be in sea and reach to Hukitola.

Gallery

References

Kendrapara district
Bays of India
Islands of Odisha
Bay of Bengal
Bays of the Indian Ocean
Islands of India
Populated places in India
Islands of the Bay of Bengal